Still at Large is the third and final album released by Crime Boss. Following the release of his successful second album, Conflicts & Confusion, Crime Boss left Suave House Records and formed his own independent label called Crime Lab Records and released Still at Large through it. Though his previous two albums were produced by Suave House's T-Mix, Crime Boss himself handled a majority of the album's production.

The album peaked at 81 on Billboard's Top R&B/Hip-Hop Albums, becoming his only one to not make it to the Billboard 200.

Track listing
"Down Low"- 2:08  
"Imagination"- 4:50  
"Unsolved Mysteries"- 4:35  
"Who Is This"- 5:36  
"See What Ya Don't See"- 4:36  
"Young Saggin"- 5:27  
"OSC"- 5:18  
"Danger Zone"- 3:25  
"Listen 2 Me"- 4:31  
"M.V.P."- 5:56  
"Big Man"- 5:01  
"Done Up"- 4:06  
"Who Ya Fucking With"- 6:51  
"For My Saggin"- 3:06

Charts

References

External links
[ Still at Large] at Allmusic
Still at Large at Tower Records
[ Still at Large] at Billboard

1998 albums
Crime Boss (rapper) albums